The Simpsons is an American animated television sitcom created by Matt Groening for Fox. It is a satirical depiction of a middle class American lifestyle epitomized by its eponymous family, which consists of Homer, Marge, Bart, Lisa, and Maggie. The show is set in the fictional town of Springfield, and lampoons American culture, society, and television, as well as many aspects of the human condition. The family was conceived by Groening shortly before a pitch for a series of animated shorts with producer James L. Brooks. Groening created a dysfunctional family and named the characters after members of his own family, substituting Bart for his own name. The shorts became a part of the Fox series The Tracey Ullman Show on April 19, 1987. After a three-season run, the sketch was developed into a half-hour prime-time show that was an early hit for Fox.

Throughout the years, many episodes of the show have been released on VHS, DVD and Blu-ray. When the first season DVD was released in 2001, it quickly became the best-selling television DVD set in history, although it was later overtaken by the first season of Chappelle's Show. The first twenty seasons are available on DVD in Regions 1, 2, and 4, with the twentieth season released on DVD and Blu-ray in 2010 to commemorate the 20th anniversary of the series. The Simpsons Movie, a feature-length film, was released in theaters worldwide on July 27, 2007, and was later available on DVD and Blu-ray worldwide on December 3, 2007 and on December 18, 2007 in the U.S. 

On April 8, 2015, show runner Al Jean announced that there would be no more DVD or Blu-ray releases, shifting focus to digital distribution. Two years later, following fan protest, season 18 was released on December 5, 2017 on DVD with the possibility of further seasons if sales were strong enough. Two years later, season 19 was released on DVD on December 3, 2019. Also on December 3, 2019, a limited-edition DVD collection consisting of seasons 1-20, limited to 1,000 units, was released.

Overview

Full season sets

DVD

Blu-ray

Compilations

VHS

DVD

References 

Home video releases
Home video releases
Simpsons, The